Stixis punctata is a species of beetle in the family Cerambycidae. It was described by Charles Joseph Gahan in 1890. It is known from Tanzania and Kenya.

References

Phrissomini
Beetles of Africa
Beetles described in 1890
Taxa named by Arthur Burton Gahan